The Mammoth Geothermal Complex is a complex of 4 geothermal power stations located at Casa Diablo Hot Springs about  east of Mammoth Lakes, California. The complex is owned by Ormat and operated by its subsidiary Mammoth Pacific.

Description
The complex consists of four binary cycle geothermal power stations, each with a nameplate capacity of 10 MW. Mammoth Pacific 1 (MP1) was commissioned in 1984 and was the first air-cooled geothermal power station in the world. Mammoth Pacific 2 (MPII) and PLES-1 were both commissioned in 1990 and use the same air-cooled technology.

In 2005, the geothermal well field was expanded into "Basalt Canyon" just west of the three power stations. Two production wells were drilled and connected to the existing power plants. In 2014, Ormat replaced the 30-year old equipment of MP1 in order to improve its efficiency.

Casa Diablo IV
In 2006, Ormat proposed the construction of a 30 MW binary cycle geothermal power plant called "Casa Diablo IV" that would double the generating capacity of the geothermal complex.

In 2014, the Mammoth Community Water District (MCWD) sued the Great Basin Unified Air Pollution Control District (GBUAP) and ORNI 50 LLC (Ormat) over concerns that the power plant would compromise the water supply of Mammoth Lakes. GBUAP and Ormat disputed this, arguing there was no connectivity between the deep geothermal reservoir and MCWD's groundwater aquifer based on extensive research conducted on the site. On June 25, 2015, the Mono County Superior Court ruled in favor of GBUAP and Ormat. In addition, on August 31, 2015, the Interior Board of Land Appeals denied an appeal made by MCWD.

Casa Diablo IV is expected to be operational by the end of 2021. As of July 14th, 2022, Ormat announced that commercial operations at Casa Diablo IV had begun.

Geology

The Mammoth Geothermal Complex is located at the base of a large resurgent dome near the center of the Long Valley Caldera. The dome was formed from the swelling or rising of the caldera floor due to movement in the magma chamber beneath it. The geothermal complex utilizes this heat to power its binary cycle power generators.

See also
 List of geothermal power stations in the United States
 List of power stations in California

References

1984 establishments in California
Buildings and structures in Mono County, California
Energy infrastructure completed in 1984
Geothermal power stations in California